Rhode Island ratified the United States Constitution on May 29, 1790 and elects its U.S. senators to Class 1 and Class 2. The state's current U.S. senators are Democrats Jack Reed (since 1997) and Sheldon Whitehouse (since 2007). Claiborne Pell was Rhode Island's longest-serving senator (1961–1997).

List of senators

|- style="height:2em"
| colspan=3 | Vacant
| nowrap | May 29, 1790 –Jun 7, 1790
| Rhode Island did not elect its U.S. senators until Jun 7, 1790.
| rowspan=2 | 1
| rowspan=2 
| rowspan=3 | 1
| Rhode Island did not elect its U.S. senators until Jun 7, 1790.
| nowrap | May 29, 1790 –Jun 7, 1790
| colspan=3 | Vacant

|- style="height:2em"
! rowspan=11 | 1
| rowspan=11 align=left | Theodore Foster
| rowspan=3  | Pro-Admin.
| rowspan=11 nowrap | Jun 7, 1790 –Mar 3, 1803
| Elected in 1790.
| rowspan=2 | Elected in 1790.
| rowspan=2 nowrap | Jun 7, 1790 –Mar 3, 1793
| rowspan=2  | Anti-Admin.
| rowspan=2 align=right | Joseph Stanton Jr.
! rowspan=2 | 1

|- style="height:2em"
| rowspan=3 | Re-elected in 1791.
| rowspan=3 | 2
| 

|- style="height:2em"
| 
| rowspan=5 | 2
| rowspan=3 | Elected in 1793.Resigned.
| rowspan=3 nowrap | Mar 4, 1793 –Oct 1797
|  | Pro-Admin.
| rowspan=3 align=right | William Bradford
! rowspan=3 | 2

|- style="height:2em"
| rowspan=8  | Federalist
| 
| rowspan=2  | Federalist

|- style="height:2em"
| rowspan=7 | Re-elected in 1797.Retired.
| rowspan=7 | 3
| rowspan=3 

|- style="height:2em"
|  
| nowrap | Oct 1797 –Nov 13, 1797
| colspan=3 | Vacant

|- style="height:2em"
| rowspan=1 | Elected in 1797 to finish Bradford's term.
| rowspan=3 nowrap | Nov 13, 1797 –Mar 5, 1801
| rowspan=3  | Federalist
| rowspan=3 align=right | Ray Greene
! rowspan=3 | 3

|- style="height:2em"
| 
| rowspan=7 | 3
| rowspan=2 | Re-elected in 1798.Resigned.

|- style="height:2em"
| rowspan=3 

|- style="height:2em"
|  
| nowrap | Mar 5, 1801 –May 6, 1801
| colspan=3 | Vacant

|- style="height:2em"
| rowspan=4 | Elected in 1801 to finish Greene's term.Lost re-election.
| rowspan=4 nowrap | May 6, 1801 –Mar 3, 1805
| rowspan=4  | Democratic-Republican
| rowspan=4 align=right | Christopher Ellery
! rowspan=4 | 4

|- style="height:2em"
! 2
| align=left | Samuel J. Potter
|  | Democratic-Republican
| nowrap | Mar 4, 1803 –Oct 14, 1804
| Elected in 1802.Died.
| rowspan=7 | 4
| rowspan=3 

|- style="height:2em"
| colspan=3 | Vacant
| nowrap | Oct 14, 1804 –Oct 29, 1804
|  

|- style="height:2em"
! rowspan=5 | 3
| rowspan=5 align=left | Benjamin Howland
| rowspan=5  | Democratic-Republican
| rowspan=5 nowrap | Oct 29, 1804 –Mar 3, 1809
| rowspan=5 | Elected in 1804 to finish Potter's term.Retired.

|- style="height:2em"
| 
| rowspan=7 | 4
| rowspan=2 | Elected in 1804.Resigned.
| rowspan=2 nowrap | Mar 4, 1805 –Sep 1807
| rowspan=2  | Democratic-Republican
| rowspan=2 align=right | James Fenner
! rowspan=2 | 5

|- style="height:2em"
| rowspan=3 

|- style="height:2em"
|  
| nowrap | Sep 1807 –Oct 26, 1807
| colspan=3 | Vacant

|- style="height:2em"
| rowspan=4 | Elected to finish Fenner's term.
| rowspan=4 nowrap | Oct 26, 1807 –Mar 3, 1811
| rowspan=4  | Democratic-Republican
| rowspan=4 align=right | Elisha Mathewson
! rowspan=4 | 6

|- style="height:2em"
! 4
| align=left | Francis Malbone
|  | Federalist
| nowrap | Mar 4, 1809 –Jun 4, 1809
| Elected in 1808.Died.
| rowspan=7 | 5
| rowspan=3 

|- style="height:2em"
| colspan=3 | Vacant
| nowrap | Jun 4, 1809 –Jun 26, 1809
|  

|- style="height:2em"
! rowspan=2 | 5
| rowspan=2 align=left | Christopher G. Champlin
| rowspan=2  | Federalist
| rowspan=2 nowrap | Jun 26, 1809 –Oct 12, 1811
| rowspan=2 | Elected in 1809 to finish Malbone's term.Resigned.

|- style="height:2em"
| rowspan=3 
| rowspan=5 | 5
| rowspan=5 | Elected in 1810.Retired.
| rowspan=5 nowrap | Mar 4, 1811 –Mar 3, 1817
| rowspan=5  | Democratic-Republican
| rowspan=5 align=right | Jeremiah B. Howell
! rowspan=5 | 7

|- style="height:2em"
| colspan=3 | Vacant
| nowrap | Oct 12, 1811 –Oct 28, 1811
|  

|- style="height:2em"
! rowspan=7 | 6
| rowspan=7 align=left | William Hunter
| rowspan=7  | Federalist
| rowspan=7 nowrap | Oct 28, 1811 –Mar 3, 1821
| rowspan=2 | Elected in 1811 to finish Champlin's term.

|- style="height:2em"
| 

|- style="height:2em"
| rowspan=5 | Re-elected in 1814.
| rowspan=5 | 6
| 

|- style="height:2em"
| 
| rowspan=5 | 6
| rowspan=2 | Elected in 1816.Died.
| rowspan=2 nowrap | Mar 4, 1817 –Dec 25, 1820
| rowspan=2  | Federalist
| rowspan=2 align=right | James Burrill Jr.
! rowspan=2 | 8

|- style="height:2em"
| rowspan=3 

|- style="height:2em"
|  
| nowrap | Dec 25, 1820 –Jan 9, 1821
| colspan=3 | Vacant

|- style="height:2em"
| rowspan=2 | Elected in 1821 to finish Burrill's term.
| rowspan=12 nowrap | Jan 9, 1821 –Mar 3, 1841
| rowspan=3  | Democratic-Republican
| rowspan=12 align=right | Nehemiah R. Knight
! rowspan=12 | 9

|- style="height:2em"
! rowspan=3 | 7
| rowspan=3 align=left | James DeWolf
| rowspan=2  | Democratic-Republican
| rowspan=3 nowrap | Mar 4, 1821 –Oct 31, 1825
| rowspan=3 | Election date unknown.Resigned.
| rowspan=4 | 7
| 

|- style="height:2em"
| 
| rowspan=4 | 7
| rowspan=4 | Re-elected in 1823.

|- style="height:2em"
|  | NationalRepublican
| rowspan=2 
| rowspan=7  | NationalRepublican

|- style="height:2em"
! rowspan=7 | 8
| rowspan=7 align=left | Asher Robbins
| rowspan=6  | NationalRepublican
| rowspan=7 nowrap | Oct 31, 1825 –Mar 3, 1839
| Elected in 1825 to finish DeWolf's term.

|- style="height:2em"
| rowspan=3 | Re-elected in 1827.
| rowspan=3 | 8
| 

|- style="height:2em"
| 
| rowspan=3 | 8
| rowspan=3 | Re-elected in 1829.

|- style="height:2em"
| 

|- style="height:2em"
| rowspan=3 | Re-elected in 1833.
| rowspan=3 | 9
| 

|- style="height:2em"
| 
| rowspan=3 | 9
| rowspan=3 | Re-elected in 1835.

|- style="height:2em"
|  | Whig
| 
| rowspan=2  | Whig

|- style="height:2em"
! rowspan=2 | 9
| rowspan=2 align=left | Nathan F. Dixon I
| rowspan=2  | Whig
| rowspan=2 nowrap | Mar 4, 1839 –Jan 29, 1842
| rowspan=2 | Election date unknown.Died.
| rowspan=7 | 10
| 

|- style="height:2em"
| rowspan=3 
| rowspan=7 | 10
| rowspan=7 | Elected in 1841.Lost re-election.
| rowspan=7 nowrap | Mar 4, 1841 –Mar 3, 1847
| rowspan=7  | Whig
| rowspan=7 align=right | James F. Simmons
! rowspan=7 | 10

|- style="height:2em"
| colspan=3 | Vacant
| nowrap | Jan 29, 1842 –Feb 18, 1842
|  

|- style="height:2em"
! rowspan=2 | 10
| rowspan=2 align=left | William Sprague III
| rowspan=2  | Whig
| rowspan=2 nowrap | Feb 18, 1842 –Jan 17, 1844
| rowspan=2 | Elected in 1842 to finish Dixon's term.Resigned.

|- style="height:2em"
| rowspan=3 

|- style="height:2em"
| colspan=3 | Vacant
| nowrap | Jan 17, 1844 –Jan 25, 1844
|  

|- style="height:2em"
! 11
| align=left | John Brown Francis
|  | Law and Order
| nowrap | Jan 25, 1844 –Mar 3, 1845
| Elected in 1844 to finish Sprague's term.Retired.

|- style="height:2em"
! rowspan=3 | 12
| rowspan=3 align=left | Albert C. Greene
| rowspan=3  | Whig
| rowspan=3 nowrap | Mar 4, 1845 –Mar 3, 1851
| rowspan=3 | Election date unknown.Retired.
| rowspan=3 | 11
| 

|- style="height:2em"
| 
| rowspan=3 | 11
| rowspan=3 | Election date unknown.
| rowspan=3 nowrap | Mar 4, 1847 –Mar 3, 1853
| rowspan=3  | Whig
| rowspan=3 align=right | John Hopkins Clarke
! rowspan=3 | 11

|- style="height:2em"
| 

|- style="height:2em"
! rowspan=4 | 13
| rowspan=4 align=left | Charles T. James
| rowspan=4  | Democratic
| rowspan=4 nowrap | Mar 4, 1851 –Mar 3, 1857
| rowspan=4 | Election date unknown.Retired.
| rowspan=4 | 12
| 

|- style="height:2em"
| rowspan=2 
| rowspan=4 | 12
|  
| nowrap | Mar 4, 1853 –Jul 20, 1853
| colspan=3 | Vacant

|- style="height:2em"
| rowspan=3 | Elected late.Retired.
| rowspan=3 nowrap | Jul 20, 1853 –Mar 3, 1859
| rowspan=3  | Democratic
| rowspan=3 align=right | Philip Allen! rowspan=3 | 12

|- style="height:2em"
| 

|- style="height:2em"
! rowspan=3 | 14
| rowspan=3 align=left | James F. Simmons
| rowspan=3  | Republican
| rowspan=3 nowrap | Mar 4, 1857 –Aug 15, 1862
| rowspan=3 | Elected in 1856.Resigned.
| rowspan=5 | 13
| 

|- style="height:2em"
| 
| rowspan=5 | 13
| rowspan=5 | Elected in 1858.
| rowspan=17 nowrap | Mar 4, 1859 –Sep 2, 1884
| rowspan=17  | Republican
| rowspan=17 align=right | Henry B. Anthony
! rowspan=17 | 13

|- style="height:2em"
| rowspan=3 

|- style="height:2em"
| colspan=3 | Vacant
| nowrap | Aug 15, 1862 –Dec 1, 1862
|  

|- style="height:2em"
! 15
| align=left | Samuel G. Arnold
|  | Republican
| nowrap | Dec 1, 1862 –Mar 3, 1863
| Elected in 1862 to finish Simmons's term.

|- style="height:2em"
! rowspan=6 | 16
| rowspan=6 align=left | William Sprague IV| rowspan=6  | Republican
| rowspan=6 nowrap | Mar 4, 1863 –Mar 3, 1875
| rowspan=3 | Elected in 1862.
| rowspan=3 | 14
| 

|- style="height:2em"
| 
| rowspan=3 | 14
| rowspan=3 | Re-elected in 1864.

|- style="height:2em"
| 

|- style="height:2em"
| rowspan=3 | Re-elected in 1868.Retired.
| rowspan=3 | 15
| 

|- style="height:2em"
| 
| rowspan=3 | 15
| rowspan=3 | Re-elected in 1870.

|- style="height:2em"
| 

|- style="height:2em"
! rowspan=4 | 17
| rowspan=4 align=left | Ambrose Burnside| rowspan=4  | Republican
| rowspan=4 nowrap | Mar 4, 1875 –Sep 13, 1881
| rowspan=3 | Elected in 1874.
| rowspan=3 | 16
| 

|- style="height:2em"
| 
| rowspan=5 | 16
| rowspan=5 | Re-elected in 1876.

|- style="height:2em"
| 

|- style="height:2em"
| Re-elected in 1880.Died.
| rowspan=8 | 17
| rowspan=3 

|- style="height:2em"
| colspan=3 | Vacant
| nowrap | Sep 13, 1881 –Oct 5, 1881
|  

|- style="height:2em"
! rowspan=20 | 18
| rowspan=20 align=left | Nelson W. Aldrich| rowspan=20  | Republican
| rowspan=20 nowrap | Oct 5, 1881 –Mar 3, 1911
| rowspan=6 | Elected in 1881 to finish Burnside's term.

|- style="height:2em"
| rowspan=4 
| rowspan=6 | 17
| Re-elected in 1882.Died.

|- style="height:2em"
|  
| nowrap | Sep 2, 1884 –Nov 19, 1884
| colspan=3 | Vacant

|- style="height:2em"
| Appointed to continue Anthony's term.
| nowrap | Nov 19, 1884 –Jan 20, 1885
|  | Republican
| align=right | William P. Sheffield! 14

|- style="height:2em"
| rowspan=3 | Elected in 1885 to finish Anthony's term.
| rowspan=4 nowrap | Jan 20, 1885 –Apr 9, 1889
| rowspan=4  | Republican
| rowspan=4 align=right | Jonathan Chace! rowspan=4 | 15

|- style="height:2em"
| 

|- style="height:2em"
| rowspan=4 | Re-elected in 1886.
| rowspan=4 | 18
| 

|- style="height:2em"
| rowspan=2 
| rowspan=4 | 18
| Re-elected in 1888.Resigned.

|- style="height:2em"
| rowspan=3 | Elected in 1889 to finish Chace's term.Retired.
| rowspan=3 nowrap | Apr 10, 1889 –Mar 3, 1895
| rowspan=3  | Republican
| rowspan=3 align=right | Nathan F. Dixon III! rowspan=3 | 16

|- style="height:2em"
| 

|- style="height:2em"
| rowspan=3 | Re-elected in 1892.
| rowspan=3 | 19
| 

|- style="height:2em"
| 
| rowspan=3 | 19
| rowspan=3 | Elected in 1894.
| rowspan=6 nowrap | Mar 4, 1895 –Mar 3, 1907
| rowspan=6  | Republican
| rowspan=6 align=right | George P. Wetmore! rowspan=10 | 17

|- style="height:2em"
| 

|- style="height:2em"
| rowspan=3 | Re-elected in 1898.
| rowspan=3 | 20
| 

|- style="height:2em"
| 
| rowspan=3 | 20
| rowspan=3 | Re-elected in 1900.

|- style="height:2em"
| 

|- style="height:2em"
| rowspan=4 | Re-elected Jan 18, 1905.Retired.
| rowspan=4 | 21
| 

|- style="height:2em"
| rowspan=2 
| rowspan=4 | 21
| Legislature failed to elect.
| nowrap | Mar 4, 1907 –Jan 22, 1908
| colspan=2 | Vacant

|- style="height:2em"
| rowspan=3 | Elected in 1908 to finish the vacant term.Retired.
| rowspan=3 nowrap | Jan 22, 1908–Mar 3, 1913
| rowspan=3  | Republican
| rowspan=3 align=right | George P. Wetmore|- style="height:2em"
| 

|- style="height:2em"
! rowspan=3 | 19
| rowspan=3 align=left | Henry F. Lippitt
| rowspan=3  | Republican
| rowspan=3 nowrap | Mar 4, 1911 –Mar 3, 1917
| rowspan=3 | Elected in 1910.Lost re-election.
| rowspan=3 | 22
| 

|- style="height:2em"
| 
| rowspan=3 | 22
| rowspan=3 | Elected in 1913.
| rowspan=6 nowrap | Mar 4, 1913 –Aug 18, 1924
| rowspan=6  | Republican
| rowspan=6 align=right | LeBaron Bradford Colt
! rowspan=6 | 18

|- style="height:2em"
| 

|- style="height:2em"
! rowspan=8 | 20
| rowspan=8 align=left | Peter G. Gerry
| rowspan=8  | Democratic
| rowspan=8 nowrap | Mar 4, 1917 –Mar 3, 1929
| rowspan=3 | Elected in 1916.
| rowspan=3 | 23
| 

|- style="height:2em"
| 
| rowspan=5 | 23
| rowspan=3 | Re-elected in 1918.Died.

|- style="height:2em"
| 

|- style="height:2em"
| rowspan=5 | Re-elected in 1922.Lost re-election.
| rowspan=5 | 24
| rowspan=3 

|- style="height:2em"
|  
| nowrap | Aug 18, 1924 –Nov 4, 1924
| colspan=7 | Vacant

|- style="height:2em"
| Elected in 1924 to finish Colt's term.
| rowspan=7 nowrap | Nov 4, 1924 –Jan 3, 1937
| rowspan=7  | Republican
| rowspan=7 align=right | Jesse H. Metcalf
! rowspan=7 | 19

|- style="height:2em"
| 
| rowspan=3 | 24
| rowspan=3 | Elected in 1924.

|- style="height:2em"
| 

|- style="height:2em"
! rowspan=3 | 21
| rowspan=3 align=left | Felix Hebert
| rowspan=3  | Republican
| rowspan=3 nowrap | Mar 4, 1929 –Jan 3, 1935
| rowspan=3 | Elected in 1928.Lost re-election.
| rowspan=3 | 25
| 

|- style="height:2em"
| 
| rowspan=3 | 25
| rowspan=3 | Re-elected in 1930Lost re-election.

|- style="height:2em"
| 

|- style="height:2em"
! rowspan=6 | 22
| rowspan=6 align=left | Peter G. Gerry| rowspan=6  | Democratic
| rowspan=6 nowrap | Jan 3, 1935 –Jan 3, 1947
| rowspan=3 | Elected in 1934.
| rowspan=3 | 26
| 

|- style="height:2em"
| 
| rowspan=3 | 26
| rowspan=3 | Elected in 1936.
| rowspan=15 nowrap | Jan 3, 1937 –Jan 3, 1961
| rowspan=15  | Democratic
| rowspan=15 align=right | Theodore F. Green! rowspan=15 | 20

|- style="height:2em"
| 

|- style="height:2em"
| rowspan=3 | Re-elected in 1940.Retired.
| rowspan=3 | 27
| 

|- style="height:2em"
| 
| rowspan=3 | 27
| rowspan=3 | Re-elected in 1942.

|- style="height:2em"
| 

|- style="height:2em"
! rowspan=2 | 23
| rowspan=2 align=left | J. Howard McGrath
| rowspan=2  | Democratic
| rowspan=2 nowrap | Jan 3, 1947 –Aug 23, 1949
| rowspan=2 | Elected in 1946.Resigned to become U.S. Attorney General.
| rowspan=6 | 28
| 

|- style="height:2em"
| rowspan=4 
| rowspan=6 | 28
| rowspan=6 | Re-elected in 1948.

|- style="height:2em"
! 24
| align=left | Edward L. Leahy
|  | Democratic
| nowrap | Aug 24, 1949 –Dec 10, 1950
| Appointed to continue McGrath's term.Retired.

|- style="height:2em"
| colspan=3 | Vacant
| nowrap | Dec 10, 1950 –Dec 19, 1950
|  

|- style="height:2em"
! rowspan=14 | 25
| rowspan=14 align=left | John Pastore| rowspan=14  | Democratic
| rowspan=14 nowrap | Dec 19, 1950 –Dec 28, 1976
| rowspan=2 | Elected in 1950 to finish McGrath's term.

|- style="height:2em"
| 

|- style="height:2em"
| rowspan=3 | Re-elected in 1952.
| rowspan=3 | 29
| 

|- style="height:2em"
| 
| rowspan=3 | 29
| rowspan=3 | Re-elected in 1954.Retired.

|- style="height:2em"
| 

|- style="height:2em"
| rowspan=3 | Re-elected in 1958.
| rowspan=3 | 30
| 

|- style="height:2em"
| 
| rowspan=3 | 30
| rowspan=3 | Elected in 1960.
| rowspan=19 nowrap | Jan 3, 1961 –Jan 3, 1997
| rowspan=19  | Democratic
| rowspan=19 align=right | Claiborne Pell! rowspan=19 | 21

|- style="height:2em"
| 

|- style="height:2em"
| rowspan=3 | Re-elected in 1964.
| rowspan=3 | 31
| 

|- style="height:2em"
| 
| rowspan=3 | 31
| rowspan=3 | Re-elected in 1966.

|- style="height:2em"
| 

|- style="height:2em"
| rowspan=3 | Re-elected in 1970.Retired and resigned earlyto give successor preferential seniority.
| rowspan=4 | 32
| 

|- style="height:2em"
| 
| rowspan=4 | 32
| rowspan=4 | Re-elected in 1972.

|- style="height:2em"
| rowspan=2 

|- style="height:2em"
! rowspan=13 | 26
| rowspan=13 align=left | John Chafee| rowspan=13  | Republican
| rowspan=13 nowrap | Dec 29, 1976 –Oct 24, 1999
| Appointed to finish Pastore's term, having been elected to the next term.

|- style="height:2em"
| rowspan=3 | Elected in 1976.
| rowspan=3 | 33
| 

|- style="height:2em"
| 
| rowspan=3 | 33
| rowspan=3 | Re-elected in 1978.

|- style="height:2em"
| 

|- style="height:2em"
| rowspan=3 | Re-elected in 1982.
| rowspan=3 | 34
| 

|- style="height:2em"
| 
| rowspan=3 | 34
| rowspan=3 | Re-elected in 1984.

|- style="height:2em"
| 

|- style="height:2em"
| rowspan=3 | Re-elected in 1988.
| rowspan=3 | 35
| 

|- style="height:2em"
| 
| rowspan=3 | 35
| rowspan=3 | Re-elected in 1990.Retired.

|- style="height:2em"
| 

|- style="height:2em"
| rowspan=3 | Re-elected in 1994.Died, having planned to retire at the end of term.
| rowspan=5 | 36
| 

|- style="height:2em"
| 
| rowspan=5 | 36
| rowspan=5 | Elected in 1996.
| rowspan=17 nowrap | Jan 3, 1997 –Present
| rowspan=17  | Democratic
| rowspan=17 align=right | Jack Reed! rowspan=17 | 22

|- style="height:2em"
| rowspan=3 

|- style="height:2em"
| colspan=3 | Vacant
| nowrap | Oct 24, 1999 –Nov 2, 1999
|  

|- style="height:2em"
! rowspan=4 | 27
| rowspan=4 align=left | Lincoln Chafee| rowspan=4  | Republican
| rowspan=4 nowrap | Nov 2, 1999 –Jan 3, 2007
| Appointed to finish his father's term.

|- style="height:2em"
| rowspan=3 | Elected in 2000 to a full term.Lost re-election.
| rowspan=3 | 37
| 

|- style="height:2em"
| 
| rowspan=3 | 37
| rowspan=3 | Re-elected in 2002.

|- style="height:2em"
| 

|- style="height:2em"
! rowspan=9 | 28
| rowspan=9 align=left | Sheldon Whitehouse'''
| rowspan=9  | Democratic
| rowspan=9 nowrap | Jan 3, 2007 –Present
| rowspan=3 | Elected in 2006.
| rowspan=3 | 38
| 

|- style="height:2em"
| 
| rowspan=3 | 38
| rowspan=3 | Re-elected in 2008.

|- style="height:2em"
| 

|- style="height:2em"
| rowspan=3 | Re-elected in 2012.
| rowspan=3 | 39
| 

|- style="height:2em"
| 
| rowspan=3 | 39
| rowspan=3 | Re-elected in 2014.

|- style="height:2em"
| 

|- style="height:2em"
| rowspan=3| Re-elected in 2018.
| rowspan=3 | 40
| 

|- style="height:2em"
| 
| rowspan=3 | 40
| rowspan=3 | Re-elected in 2020.

|- style="height:2em"
| 

|- style="height:2em"
| rowspan=2 colspan=5 | To be determined in the 2024 election.
| rowspan=2|41
| 

|- style="height:2em"
| 
| 41
| colspan=5 | To be determined in the 2026 election.

See also 

 List of United States representatives from Rhode Island
 United States congressional delegations from Rhode Island
 Elections in Rhode Island

References

External links 
Congressional Biographical Directory

 
United States Senators
Rhode Island